Small Time is the second album by British indie band The Servants. It was recorded in 1991 but had to wait twenty-one years for release in 2012 on the Cherry Red label.

Context
Cherry Red Records released Small Time in 2012, following the inclusion of the Servants' first album, Disinterest (1990), in Mojo magazine's 2011 list of the greatest British indie records of all time.

Luke Haines remembers the painstaking recording of Small Time in his 2009 book Bad Vibes: "The demos are great, but the album never gets made". In his sleevenotes to the finished album, Haines describes the songs as "looser, more mysterious, strange and beautiful, [. . .] and sounding . . . like nothing else really."

Reception

The album was well received. In Mojo, Kieron Tyler said "It's a sound and style that has to be heard, from a unique band that merits an instant reappraisal." In Record Collector magazine, Tim Peacock said the album had "an undernourished, if endearing demo-like quality" which showed "Westlake at his nervy, playful best." At PopMatters, Matthew Fiander called Small Time "the darker counterpart" to Disinterest, with Tim Sendra at AllMusic noting the album's "wonderfully literate and off-kilter songcraft."

Release history
Cherry Red Records issued Small Time in double-CD format in October 2012. The second disc - Hey Hey We're The Manqués - is a collection of first-album-era demos.

Captured Tracks issued Small Time and Hey Hey We're The Manqués as a gatefold double album in December 2013.

Track listing

CD

Disc one: Small Time'
Everybody Has a Dream (3:27)
Don't Leave Town (1:17)
People Going Places (1:59)
Complete Works (2:36)
Dating then Waiting (2:02)
Born to Dance (1:59)
Motivation (1:28)
Let's Live a Little (3:13)
Aim in Life (1.52)
Rejection (2:37)
Fear Eats the Soul (2:10)
The Thrill of it All (2:50)
All Talk (1:06)
Out of your Life (2:02)
Slow Dancing (3:34)
Born to Dance [2] (1:53)
The Thrill of it All [2] (2:40)
All Talk [2] (1:02)
Out of your Life [2] (2:04)

Disc two: Hey Hey We're The Manqués
The Word Around Town (3:46)
She Whom Once I Dreamt Of (2:02)
You'd Do Me Good (2:52)
She Grew and She Grew (3:26)
She's Always Hiding (3:01)
Look Like a Girl (4:04) 
Third Wheel (3:16)
Thin-Skinned (2:44)
Hey, Mrs John (2:57)
They Should Make a Statue (2:58)
Move Out (3:47)
Big Future (2:51)
Restless (4:06)
The Power of Woman (3:32)
Hush Now (5:42)
Afterglow (5:06)
Self-Destruction (2:21)

LP

Side one: Small Time
Everybody Has a Dream (3:27)
Don't Leave Town (1:17)
People Going Places (1:59)
Complete Works (2:36)
Dating then Waiting (2:02)
Born to Dance (1:59)
Motivation (1:28)
Let's Live a Little (3:13)

Side two: Small Time
Aim in Life (1.52)
Rejection (2:37)
Fear Eats the Soul (2:10)
The Thrill of it All (2:50)
All Talk (1:06)
Out of your Life (2:02)
Slow Dancing (3:34)

Side three: Hey Hey We're The Manqués
The Word Around Town (3:46)
She Whom Once I Dreamt Of (2:02)
You'd Do Me Good (2:52)
She Grew and She Grew (3:26)
She's Always Hiding (3:01)
Hey, Mrs John (2:57)
Afterglow (5:06)

Side four: Hey Hey We're The Manqués
Look Like a Girl (4:04)
Third Wheel (3:16)
Thin-Skinned (2:44)
They Should Make a Statue (2:58)
Move Out (3:47)
Big Future (2:51)
Restless (4:06)

Personnel
David Westlake – vocals, guitar and bass
Luke Haines – vocals, guitar, piano and CAT Octave VCO synthesiser

References
 
  

2012 albums
The Servants albums